Majorem is a games' studio creating online computer games and technology in the field of Massively Multiplayer Real-Time Strategy (MMORTS). 
MMORTS combines real-time strategy (RTS) with a large number of simultaneous players over the Internet. It is a type of massively multiplayer online game.

Majorem was established in 2001 in Israel aiming to supply its MMORTS technology to other game studios. However, in the same year they turned into producing a game named Ballerium to demonstrate that technology.

Majorem's Game Ballerium was in development for several years, suspended in October 2004, but reported to be back in development in December 2004, after signing a publishing deal with Interplay Entertainment. Interplay Entertainment eventually cut funding to the studios, the production once again coming to an end, though the community found enough money to finance Majorem; eventually the production continued.

See also 
MMORTS (Massively multiplayer online real-time strategy)

External links 
 Majorem 
 Ballerium

Video game companies established in 2001
Video game development companies